Dancea is a genus of small air-breathing land snails, terrestrial pulmonate gastropod mollusks in the family Euconulidae, the hive snails.

Species 
Species within the genus Dancea include:
 Dancea rodriguezensis

References

 
Euconulidae
Taxonomy articles created by Polbot